7M or 7-M can refer to:

7M-GE, a model of Toyota M engine
BT-7M, a model of BT-7 Soviet tank
Headquarters Detachment 7M, now named United States Marine Corps VMGR-252
VO-7M, now named United States Marine Corps VMA-131
AIM-7M Sparrow, alternate name for the AIM-7 Sparrow
7M platform, alternate name for Volkswagen Group B-VX62 platform
7M, the production code for the 1989 Doctor Who serial The Curse of Fenric
7M, shorthand for the Seven Mountain Mandate

See also
M7 (disambiguation)